The Ninth Summit of the Americas was an international conference held in Los Angeles, United States, from June 6 to 10, 2022. The theme was "Building a Sustainable, Resilient, and Equitable Future".

Background
The White House announced in January 2022 that the City of Los Angeles would serve as host. As host, the United States selects the site of the summit and its attendees. The United States did not invite Cuba, Venezuela, and Nicaragua to the summit as these countries are accused of having undemocratically elected leaders. It was known the US would not invite these leaders. The White House and State Department did not announce an official invitation list until May 30.

Andrés Manuel López Obrador, the President of Mexico, was the first to announce he would not attend the summit if all nations were not in attendance. López Obrador stated he would send his foreign secretary to the summit in his place. Other leaders followed, such as Xiomara Castro, the President of Honduras; Luis Arce, the President of Bolivia; Nayib Bukele, the President of El Salvador; and Ralph Gonsalves, the Prime Minister of Saint Vincent and the Grenadines.  Cuban President Miguel Díaz-Canel and Nicaraguan President Daniel Ortega said they would not attend the summit if invited.

The United States Department of State led efforts to galvanize support for the summit and keep other nations from not attending. Assistant Secretary of State for Western Hemisphere Affairs Brian A. Nichols stated the US will not invite countries that do not respect democracy.

Alejandro Giammattei, the President of Guatemala, stated he would not attend the summit after the US criticized his government's reappointment of María Consuelo Porras as attorney general, who had been accused of undermining corruption investigations. Uruguayan President Luis Lacalle Pou had been scheduled to attend, but cancelled after testing positive for COVID-19. Grenadian Prime Minister Keith Mitchell announced he would not attend due to the current election cycle in his country. Mexico, Guatemala, El Salvador, Honduras, Bolivia, Uruguay, Grenada, and Saint Kitts and Nevis sent a delegation headed by their respective secretaries or ambassadors. Cuba, Venezuela, Nicaragua, and Saint Vincent and the Grenadines had no government delegation at the summit.

Events

Monday June 6
Pre-Summit Civil Society Forum.

Tuesday June 7
Civil Society Forum, Young Americas Forum, CEO Summit of the Americas.

Wednesday June 8

Civil Society Forum, Young Americas Forum, CEO Summit of the Americas.

The inaugural ceremony was held at the Microsoft Theater in Downtown Los Angeles. Music producer Emilio Estefan organized the musical performances. Performances by Alex Fernandez Jr., Sheila E. and music written for the event by Estefan himself. The song was sung by a teenage choir. Welcome speeches were given by Mayor Eric Garcetti, California Governor Gavin Newsom and Vice President Kamala Harris.

Thursday June 9

Young Americas Forum, CEO Summit of the Americas, First plenary session.

After the first plenary session held at the Los Angeles Convention Center in Downtown Los Angeles, President Biden and First Lady Jill Biden held a dinner for world leaders and their spouses at the Getty Villa museum in the Pacific Palisades neighborhood of Los Angeles. Secretary of State Antony Blinken and Second Gentleman Douglas Emhoff hosted a dinner for foreign secretaries and their delegations at the Los Angeles County Museum of Art (LACMA). In attendance was the Los Angeles Latin diplomatic corps, the Los Angeles Consular Corps, California's two U.S. senators,  a congressional delegation headed by Speaker of the House Nancy Pelosi, California Governor Gavin Newsom and local county and city leaders.

Friday June 10

Second and third plenary session.

Twenty countries signed on to the "Los Angeles Declaration on Migration and Protection in the Americas".

Delegation leaders

References

Organization of American States
Politics of the Americas
21st-century diplomatic conferences (Americas)
2022 conferences
2022 in international relations
2022 in North America
2022 in South America
Diplomatic conferences in the United States
2022 in Los Angeles
Events in Los Angeles
June 2022 events in the United States